James Kilbourne (October 19, 1770April 9, 1850) was an American surveyor, politician from Ohio, and Episcopalian clergyman. He served two terms in the United States House of Representatives from 1813 to 1817.

Early life and career 
Kilbourne was born in New Britain in the Connecticut Colony, and moved his family to Ohio in 1803, when he founded the city of Worthington, Ohio. In 1804 a group he led founded St. John's Episcopal Church. In 1805 he was appointed United States surveyor of public lands. During the War of 1812, Kilbourne served as colonel of a frontier regiment.

In 1991, Worthington Kilbourne High School and Kilbourne Middle School, named after James Kilbourne, opened in the Worthington City School District.

He was a trustee of Ohio University from 1804 to 1820.

Congress and Ohio legislature 
Kilbourne was elected as a Democratic-Republican to two terms in the United States House of Representatives, representing Ohio's fifth district from 1813 to 1817. He was also a member of the Ohio House of Representatives in 1823, 1824, 1838 and 1839.

Later life 
Kilbourne served as an Ohio presidential elector for James Monroe in the 1820 presidential election.

He was the father of Byron Kilbourn, also a surveyor, who was a founder and mayor of Milwaukee, Wisconsin.

References

 
 Appletons' Cyclopædia of American Biography

Members of the Ohio House of Representatives
American surveyors
People from Worthington, Ohio
Ohio lawyers
1770 births
1850 deaths
Politicians from New Britain, Connecticut
1820 United States presidential electors
American military personnel of the War of 1812
Ohio University trustees
Democratic-Republican Party members of the United States House of Representatives from Ohio